In the Wind is the third mini-album played by the South Korean boy band B1A4 and was released by WM Entertainment on November 12, 2012. The track "Tried to Walk" was used as the lead single of the EP.

Track listing

Charts

Weekly chart

Monthly chart

References

2012 EPs
Korean-language EPs
B1A4 EPs